Mount Riley Wilderness is an 8,382-acre (3,392 ha) wilderness area in the Organ Mountains-Desert Peaks National Monument managed by the U.S. Bureau of Land Management in the U.S. state of New Mexico.  Established in 2019, this Wilderness located on the eastern end of the West Potrillo Mountains and bordering the nearby East Potrillo Mountains, contains three shield volcanoes that rise prominently from the Chihuahuan Desert floor.  Cox Peak is the high point of the wilderness area and the Potrillo Mountain Complex at an elevation of 5,930 feet (1807 m), Mount Riley sits at 5,905 feet (1799 m).

See also
List of U.S. Wilderness Areas

References

External links
Organ Mountains Desert Peaks National Monument Wilderness - New Mexico Wilderness Alliance
Hiking Mount Riley - SummitPost.org

IUCN Category Ib
Wilderness areas of New Mexico
Organ Mountains–Desert Peaks National Monument
Protected areas of Doña Ana County, New Mexico
Protected areas established in 2019